Xichan Temple is a Buddhist temple located in Lizhou Town of Xichang, Sichuan, China.

History
The temple traces its origins to the former Temple of Guru, founded in 1577 during the reign of Wanli Emperor in the Ming dynasty (1368–1644) and would later become the Xichan Temple.

On May 19, 1935, while the Red Army led by Zhou Enlai marched from Sichuan to Shaanxi, they stayed at Xichan Temple for six days.

After the 3rd Plenary Session of the 11th Central Committee of the Chinese Communist Party, according to the national policy of free religious belief, Xichan Temple was reopened for worshiping. In 1989 Master Jishan supervised the reconstruction of Xichan Temple on the original site.

References

Buddhist temples in Sichuan
Buildings and structures in Liangshan
Tourist attractions in Liangshan
1989 establishments in China
20th-century Buddhist temples
Religious buildings and structures completed in 1989